Benmoreite is a silica-undersaturated volcanic rock of intermediate composition. It is a sodium-rich variety of trachyandesite and belongs to the alkalic suite of igneous rocks.

Nepheline benmoreite

An origin by fractionation from basanite through nepheline hawaiite to nepheline benmoreite has been demonstrated for a volcanic suite in the McMurdo Volcanic Group of late Cenozoic age in McMurdo Sound area of Antarctica. Nepheline benmoreite magmas derived from mantle sources, containing lherzolite xenoliths, display similarities to some plutonic nepheline syenites.

See also

References

Petrology
Intermediate rocks
Volcanic rocks